Bel Marin Keys is an unincorporated community in Marin County, California. It lies at an elevation of 10 feet (3 m).

Geography

Bel Marin Keys is a waterfront community located east of the city of Novato. The community has approximately 700 homes. Most of the homes sit either on one of the many lagoons or on Novato Creek. All of the lagoons have access to San Pablo Bay through the navigational locks. The community is in ZIP code 94949 and area codes 415 and 628.

Bel Marin Keys was a planned community built between the late 1950s and late 1980s. Phases 1 through 4 were completed, but phase 5 was never built and instead the land is in the process of being restored back into the wetlands of Whiteside marsh, which were drained in the early 1900s for farm land. Phase 5 would have roughly doubled the size of Bel Marin Keys had it been built.

Government
In the California State Legislature, Bel Marin Keys is in the 2nd Senate District, and in the 10th Assembly District.

References

External links
 Bel Marin Keys Community Website
 Bel Marin Keys Unit V Wetland Restoration Design Process website.
 Hamiltonwetlands.gov: Official Hamilton/Bel Marin Keys Wetlands Restoration Project website — Whiteside Marsh project.
 

Unincorporated communities in Marin County, California
San Pablo Bay
Unincorporated communities in California
Populated coastal places in California